The Northern Mariana Islands competed at the 2022 World Aquatics Championships in Budapest, Hungary from 17 June to 3 July.

Swimming

Northern Mariana Islands entered four swimmers.

Men

Women

Mixed

References

Nations at the 2022 World Aquatics Championships
Northern Mariana Islands at the World Aquatics Championships
2022 in Northern Mariana Islands sports